Takar Paja (born 18 January 1994) is an Indian cricketer. He made his List A debut for Arunachal Pradesh in the 2018–19 Vijay Hazare Trophy on 28 September 2018.

References

External links
 

1994 births
Living people
Indian cricketers
Arunachal Pradesh cricketers
Place of birth missing (living people)
Wicket-keepers